Hearst railway station in Hearst, Ontario, Canada is a disused railway station which acted as the terminus for the Algoma Central Railway train service.  The Algoma Central Railway is a subsidiary of Canadian National Railway. Passenger service ended in July 2015.

References

Canadian National Railway stations in Ontario
Railway stations closed in 2015